Torrens Transit is an Australian bus service operator in Adelaide. It operates some services as part of the Adelaide Metro network under contract to the Government of South Australia. It is a subsidiary of Transit Systems, which is a part of the Kelsian Group.

History 

On 23 April 2000, Torrens Transit commenced operating the Adelaide Metro East–West contract with 255 buses under contract to the Government of South Australia.

In April 2005, Torrens Transit commenced operating the North–South and Outer North East contracts that had previously been run by Serco.

In July 2011, Torrens Transit commenced operating a new eight-year East–West contract with an optional four-year extension exercisable if performance criteria are met. However the North–South and Outer North East area contracts passed to Light-City Buses in October 2011.

In April 2013, Light-City Buses was stripped of eight routes for continued poor performance with these being returned to Torrens Transit.

On 10 November 2014, Torrens Transit commenced operating a new service between the CBD and Adelaide Airport with a double deck Bustech CDi.

In June 2018, the Light-City Buses business was integrated with Torrens Transit following Transit Systems purchasing it from Broadspectrum, doubling the fleet to 700 buses. This marked the return of Light-City routes to Torrens Transit after seven years.

On 5 July 2020, Torrens Transit retained its East West, Outer North East and North South contracts and took over the Outer North contract from SouthLink. All four bus contracts will run for 8 years. Additionally, its North–South contract was expanded to include the Glenelg tram line and is operated by Torrens Connect, a joint venture between Torrens Transit, UGL Rail and John Holland.

Fleet 
As at May 2021, the fleet consisted of 862 buses. Buses are painted in Adelaide Metro liveries v1, v2, New, Hybrid, and sometimes in All Over Advertising. In 2000 Torrens Transit inherited a fleet of Dennis Dart, MAN NL202, MAN SL202, Volvo B58 articulated and Volvo B59s from TransAdelaide.

Depots
Torrens Transit operates seven depots in Mile End, Newton, Edinburgh North, Port Adelaide, Morphettville, St Agnes and Glengowrie.

References

External links 
 Transit Systems
 Adelaide Metro
 Flickr gallery

Bus companies of South Australia
Transport in Adelaide
Transport companies established in 2000
2000 establishments in Australia